Qualification for the 2014 United States Men's Curling Championship consisted of three different paths. Four teams qualified directly through the High Performance Program or the Order of Merit system. The number of the remaining entrants to the national championships was cut down to six teams through a challenge round held in early January.

Qualification system
Teams can qualify to participate in the men's national championship through the High Performance Program, through the World Curling Tour Order of Merit, or through a challenge round.

Two spots in the nationals were awarded to two teams on the United States Curling Association's High Performance National Program. The teams qualified through the High Performance Program were those skipped by John Shuster and Pete Fenson. Two more spots were awarded to the top two men's teams on the World Curling Tour Order of Merit standings table at the year's end. The teams qualified through the Order of Merit were those skipped by Heath McCormick and Brady Clark.

The remaining six spots in the nationals will be awarded to the teams that earn qualification spots through the challenge round. The challenge round will be held in a triple knockout format.

Challenge round
The challenge round for the men's nationals will be held from January 9 to 12 at the Four Seasons Curling Club in Blaine, Minnesota.

Teams

Knockout draw brackets

A Event

B Event

C Event

Knockout results

Draw 1
Thursday, January 9, 7:00 pm

Draw 2
Friday, January 10, 9:00 am

Draw 3
Friday, January 10, 2:00 pm

Draw 4
Friday, January 10, 7:00 pm

Draw 5
Saturday, January 11, 9:00 am

Draw 6
Saturday, January 11, 2:00 pm

Draw 7
Saturday, January 11, 7:00 pm

Draw 8
Sunday, January 12, 9:00 am

Draw 9
Sunday, January 12, 2:00 pm

Draw 10
Sunday, January 12, 7:00 pm

References

2014 in curling
2014
Anoka County, Minnesota
2014 in sports in Minnesota
2014 in American sports
Curling in Minnesota
Qualification for curling competitions